Cadereyta may refer to:
Cadereyta de Montes, Querétaro, Mexico
Cadereyta Jiménez, Nuevo León, Mexico
Cadereyta Jiménez massacre